The 1851 Sicily tornadoes were two tornadoes that swept the Marsala countryside in western Sicily, Kingdom of the Two Sicilies (now Italy) in December 8,  1851. 

The total number of victims is unknown, but is assessed at over 500. It is one of the 10 deadliest tornadoes ever, achieving the second highest death toll for a tornado event in European history after the Valletta, Malta Tornado.

On 20 December 1851, the Illustrated London News published a report dating back to December 8 submitted by local sources in Malta, describing the path of two large waterspouts that crossed Sicilian plains from Marsala to Castellamare del Golfo, moving north-eastbound thereafter

Along their path, heavy rain and hailstorms caused additional damage to farmlands.

The most stricken area was Castellamare, where half the town was destroyed and about 200 citizens perished. The city harbor sustained serious damage, with many vessels destroyed or capsized and their crews lost at sea.

See also 
List of tornadoes and tornado outbreaks
List of European tornadoes and tornado outbreaks

References

Tornadoes
1851 meteorology
1851 in Europe
1851 natural disasters
1851 in Italy
December 1851 events
Tornadoes in Italy
Tornadoes of 1851